Grey area or gray area may refer to a fuzzy border between two states, such as legal and illegal actions. It may also refer to:

 Grey Area (album), a 2019 album by Little Simz
 Grey Area (gallery), an art project in Paris
 Grey Area (short story collection), a collection of short stories by Will Self
 Grey Area (video game company), a gaming company known for Shadow Cities
 The Grey Area, a 2012 documentary film
 The Grey Area (album), a 2003 album by Onry Ozzborn
 The Grey Area (Mute), a record label
 Gray Area Foundation for the Arts, an media arts organization and exhibition space in San Francisco
 Gray Areas, a subculture magazine
 Loophole, an ambiguity in the law

See also 
 Grey zone (disambiguation)
 Shades of gray (disambiguation)
 Splitting (psychology)